The Roman Catholic Diocese of Graz-Seckau is a Latin Church diocese comprising the Austrian state of Styria. It is part of the ecclesiastical province of Salzburg.

History

The See of Seckau was founded on 22 June 1218, then the third suffragan of Salzburg after Gurk (1072) and Chiemsee (1215), by Archbishop Eberhard von Regensberg with permission by Pope Honorius III. Emperor Frederick II gave his consent on 26 October 1218; he conferred on the incumbent of the see the dignity of a Prince of the Roman Empire, though with no secular power. A fourth suffragan diocese, Lavant, followed in 1228.

The first bishop was Provost Karl von Friesach (1218–30) who had his see at Seckau Abbey in Upper Styria; his diocese only comprised 13 parishes. Most of the time, the Seckau bishops resided at Seggau Castle near Leibnitz and at Graz, they also served as vicars in the Duchy of Styria. Under the Habsburg emperor Joseph II, the diocese was reorganised and its territory enlarged. However, the original intention of the emperor to establish an archbishopric at Graz, the capital of Styria, was frustrated by the opposition of the Archbishop of Salzburg.

In 1786, the episcopal see was finally transferred from Seckau to Graz Cathedral, though the name of the diocese remained unchanged until 1963. A new cathedral chapter was installed, composed at first of three dignitaries and four canons. The see included thenceforth the Salzburg territory in Styria; at the same time, the short-lived Diocese of Leoben was created in Upper Styria. After the death of the first and only Bishop of Leoben, the administration of this see was again entrusted in 1808 to the Bishops of Seckau at Graz. The limits of Seckau are due to a regulation of 1859, incorporating the Diocese of Leoben into that of Seckau, while Seckau ceded Lower Styria with its (chiefly) Slovene-speaking population to the Diocese of Lavant with its see at Maribor (Marburg).

Special churches

 Church of Göss Abbey, briefly the cathedral of the Diocese of Leoben (Dom Sankt Maria und Andreas): parish church; former abbey church and former cathedral
 Mariazell Basilica (Basilika Mariä Geburt) in Mariazell: minor basilica and national shrine  
 Mariatrost Basilica (Basilika Maria Trost) in Mariatrost: minor basilica
 Church of Rein Abbey: abbey church and minor basilica
The Diocese also operates a religious museum (Diözesanmuseum), housed in the former Jesuit University building in the Graz Old Town across from the cathedral and the Church of St. Catherine of Alexandria with the mausoleum of Emperor Ferdinand II.

Leadership, in reverse chronological order
The current bishop, Wilhelm Krautwaschl, was appointed by Pope Francis on Thursday, April 16, 2015. He was Rector of the Episcopal Seminary in Graz and Vocations Director and Tribunal Judge (since 2006).
 Bishops of Graz-Seckau (Roman rite):
 Bishop Wilhelm Krautwaschl (2015.04.16 – present)
 Bishop Egon Kapellari (2001.03.14 – 2015.01.28)
 Bishop Johann Weber (1969.06.10 – 2001.03.14)
 Bishop Josef Schoiswohl (see below 1963.04.22 – 1969.01.01), became titular Archbishop upon retirement
 Bishops of Seckau (Roman rite):
 Bishop Josef Schoiswohl (1954.01.18 – 1963.04.22 see above)
 Bishop Ferdinand Stanislaus Pawlikowski (1927.04.26 – 1953.12.07), became titular Archbishop upon retirement
 Bishop Leopold Schuster (1893.10.20 – 1927.03.18)
 Bishop Johann Baptist Zwerger (1867.08.14 – 1893.08.14)
 Bishop Ottokar Maria Graf von Attems (1853.09.10 – 1867.04.12)
 Bishop Joseph Othmar von Rauscher (1849.01.29 – 1853.06.27), appointed Archbishop of Vienna (Cardinal in 1855)
 Bishop Roman Sebastian (Franz Xaver) Zängerle, O.S.B. (1824.05.18 – 1848.04.27)
 Fr. Simon Melchior de Petris (1812.04.19 – 1823.08.01), was Vicar Apostolic; was never consecrated bishop
 Bishop Johann Friedrich Graf von Waldenstein-Wartenberg (1802.07.21 – 1812.04.15)
 Bishop Joseph Adam Graf Arco (1780.01.01 – 1802.06.03), became Archbishop (personal title) in 1793
 Bishop Joseph Philipp Franz Reichsgraf von Spaur (1763.10.01 – 1780.03.20)
 Bishop Leopold Ernest von Firmian (1739.02.13 – 1763.09.01), appointed Bishop of Passau (now in Germany); future Cardinal
 Bishop Jakob Ernst Graf von Liechtenstein-Kastelkorn (1728.01.17 – 1739.01.26), appointed Bishop of Olomouc (Olmütz) (now in Czech Republic); future Archbishop
 Bishop Leopold Anton Eleutherius Reichsfreiherr von Firmian (1724 – 1727.12.22), appointed Archbishop of Salzburg
 Bishop Karl Joseph Reichsgraf von Kuenburg (1723.04.21 – 1723.10.04)
 Bishop Joseph Dominicus von Lamberg (1712.03.13 – 1723.03.15), appointed Bishop of Passau (now in Germany) (Cardinal in 1737)
 Bishop Franz Anton Adolph Graf von Wagensperg (1702 – 1712.02.18)
 Bishop Rudolf Joseph Reichsgraf von Thun (1690.02.16 – 1702.05.20)
 Bishop Johann Ernst Reichsgraf von Thun (1679.12.29 – 1687.11.24), appointed Archbishop of Salzburg
 Bishop Wenzel Wilhelm Reichsgraf von Hofkirchen (1670.02.20 – 1679.11.06)
 Archbishop Maximilian Gandolph von Künburg (Apostolic Administrator 1668.11.12 – 1687.05.03) (Cardinal in 1686)
 Bishop Maximilian Gandolph von Künburg (1665.02.07 – 1668.07.30), appointed Archbishop of Salzburg; future Cardinal 
 Bishop Johannes Markus Freiherr von Aldringen (1633.08.22 – 1664.02.02)

See also
Roman Catholicism in Austria

References

Sources

 GCatholic.org
 Catholic Hierarchy
  Diocese website
 Diocesan Museum Graz

Roman Catholic dioceses in Austria
Religious organizations established in the 1210s
1218 establishments in Europe
Roman Catholic dioceses established in the 13th century
Graz-Seckau, Roman Catholic Diocese of
13th-century establishments in Austria
Establishments in the Duchy of Styria